

Sponsorship

Club

Coaching staff
{|class="wikitable"
|-
!Position
!Staff
|-
|General Manager|| Aung Hein Khaing
|-
|Head coach|| Desaeyere Rene Oscar
|-
| Assistant coach|| U Zaw Lay Aung
|-
|Team manager|| Aung Kyaw Moe
|-
|Fitness coach|| Joseph Ronald D'Angelus
|-

Other information

|-

Squad information

First-team squad

Transfers

In:

Out:

References

 Yadanarbon FC

External links
 First Eleven Journal in Burmese
 Soccer Myanmar in Burmese

Myanmar National League